Products made from a variety of materials can be recycled using a number of processes.

Building and construction waste

Aggregates and concrete

Concrete aggregate collected from demolition sites is put through a crushing machine, often along with asphalt, bricks, dirt, and rocks. Smaller pieces of concrete are used as gravel for new construction projects. Crushed recycled concrete can also be used as the dry aggregate for new concrete if it is free of contaminants. Builder's rubble (like broken down bricks) is also used for railway ballast and gravel paths. This reduces the need for other rocks to be dug up, which in turn saves trees and habitats.

Asphalt and tarmac
Asphalt including asphalt shingle can be melted down and in part recycled. Tarmac can also recycled and there is now an active market for recycling tarmac in the developed world. This includes tarmac scalpings produced when roads are scarified before a new surface is laid.

Gypsum, plaster and plasterboard products
Because up to 17% of gypsum products are wasted during the manufacturing and installation processes. Wallboard (Australia and others), plasterboard, Gyp (New Zealand), drywall (USA)  or plasterboard (UK and Ireland)  is frequently not re-used and disposal can become a problem. Some landfill sites have banned dumping of gypsum because of the tendency to produce large volumes of hydrogen sulfide gas. Some manufacturers take back waste wallboards from construction sites and recycle it into new wallboard. Gypsum waste from new construction, demolition and refurbishment activities can be turned into recycled gypsum through mechanical processes, and the recycled gypsum obtained can replace virgin gypsum in the Gypsum Industry. Some of the reasons for recycling this waste are: 
 Gypsum is one of the few construction materials for which closed loop recycling is possible.
 Closed loop gypsum recycling  saves virgin gypsum resources.
 According to the European Directive 2008/98/EC on Waste, recycling should be preferred to recovery and landfill disposal. 
 This Directive also establishes that the preparing for re-use, recycling and other material recovery of non-hazardous Construction and Demolition (C&D) waste (excluding soil and stones other that those containing dangerous substances) have to be increased to a minimum of 70% by weight by 2020.
 The disposal of gypsum-based materials can become a problem if they are accepted at normal cells in non-hazardous landfills, as the sulphate content of gypsum mixed with organic waste can break down under certain conditions into hydrogen sulfide gas.

Bricks
Intact bricks recovered from demolition can be cleaned and re-used.

Batteries

The large variation in size and type of batteries makes their recycling extremely difficult: they must first be sorted into similar kinds and each kind requires an individual recycling process. Additionally, older batteries contain  mercury and cadmium, harmful materials that must be handled with care. Because of their potential environmental damage, proper disposal of used batteries is required by law in many areas. Unfortunately, this mandate has been difficult to enforce.

Lead-acid batteries, like those used in automobiles, are relatively easy to recycle and many regions have legislation requiring vendors to accept used products. In the United States, the recycling rate is 90%, with new batteries containing up to 80% recycled material.

Japan, Kuwait, the USA, Canada, France, the Netherlands, Germany, Austria, Belgium, Sweden, the UK and Ireland all actively encourage  battery recycling programs.  In 2006, the EU passed the Battery Directive of which one of the aims is a higher rate of battery recycling. The EU directive said at least 25% of all the EU's used batteries must be collected by 2012, and rising to no less than 45% by 2016, of which, that at least 50% of them must be recycled.

Biodegradable waste

Kitchen, garden, and other green waste can be recycled into useful material by composting into leaf mold and regular compost. This process allows natural aerobic bacteria to break down the waste into fertile topsoil. Much composting is done on a household scale, but municipal green-waste collection programs also exist. These programs can supplement their funding by selling the topsoil produced.

Electronic waste

Electronics disassembly and reclamation

Electronic recycling is recycling or reuse of computers or other electronics. It includes both finding another use for materials (such as donation to charity), and having systems dismantled in a manner that allows for the safe extraction of the constituent materials for reuse in other products. The direct disposal of electrical equipment—such as old computers and mobile phones is banned in many areas, such as the UK, parts of the USA, Japan, Ireland, Germany and the Netherlands, due to the toxic contents of certain components. The recycling process works by mechanically separating the metals, plastics, and circuit boards contained in the appliance. When this is done on a large scale at an electronic waste recycling plant, component recovery can be achieved cost-effectively.

With high lead content in CRTs, and the rapid diffusion of new flat-panel display technologies, some of which (LCDs) use lamps containing mercury, there is growing concern about electronic waste from discarded televisions. Related occupational health concerns exist, as well, for disassemblers and scrap dealers removing copper wiring and other materials from CRTs. Further environmental concerns related to television design and use relate to the devices' increasing electrical energy requirements.

Computers that are termed trashware in North America or totally reconditioned hardware in the UK and Ireland are computer equipment that has assembled from old hardware, using cleaned and checked parts from different computers, for use by disadvantaged people to bridge the digital divide. Trashware is different from retrocomputing, which has only cultural and recreational purposes.

Ink jet printer cartridges

Because printer cartridges from the original manufacturer are often expensive, demand exists for cheaper third party options. These include ink sold in bulk, cartridge refill kits, machines in stores that automatically refill cartridges, re-manufactured cartridges, and cartridges made by a corporate entity other than the original manufacturer.

Consumers can refill ink cartridges themselves with a kit, or they can take the cartridge to a refiller or re-manufacturer where ink is pumped back into the cartridge. PC World reports that refilled cartridges have higher failure rates, print fewer pages than new cartridges, and demonstrate more on-page problems like streaking, curling, and colour bleed.

Metals

A wide range of metals in commercial and domestic use have well developed recycling markets in most developed countries.  Domestic recycling is commonly available for Iron and steel, aluminium and in particular beverage and food cans. In addition, building metals such as copper, zinc and lead are readily recyclable through specialised companies. In the UK, these are usually either specialised scrap dealers or car breakers. Other metals present in smaller quantities in the domestic waste stream such as tin and chromium are also extracted from metal put into the recycling system but are rarely recovered from the general waste stream.

Paint

Paper and newsprint

Paper and newsprint can be recycled by reducing it to pulp and combining it with pulp from newly harvested wood. As the recycling process causes the paper fibres to break down, each time paper is recycled its quality decreases. This means that either a higher percentage of new fibres must be added, or the paper down-cycled into lower quality products. Any writing or colouration of the paper must first be removed by deinking, which also removes fillers, clays, and fibre fragments.

Almost all paper can be recycled today, but some types are harder to recycle than others. Papers coated with plastic or aluminium foil, and papers that are waxed, pasted, or gummed are usually not recycled because the process is too expensive.

Sometimes recyclers ask for the removal of the glossy paper inserts from newspapers because they are a different type of paper. Glossy inserts have a heavy clay coating that some paper mills cannot accept. Most of the clay is removed from the recycled pulp as sludge, which must be disposed of. If the coated paper is 20% by weight clay, then each ton of glossy paper produces more than 200 kg of sludge and less than 800 kg of fibre.

The price of recycled paper has varied greatly over the last 30 or so years.

 The German price of €100/£49 per tonne was typical for the year 2003  and it steadily rose over the years. By the September 2008 saw the American price of $235 per ton, which had fallen to just $120 per ton, and in the January 2009, the UK's fell six weeks from about £70.00 per ton, to only £10.00 per ton. The slump was probably due to the economic down turn in East Asia leading to market for waste paper drying up in China. 2010 averaged at $120.32 over the start of the year, but saw a rapid rise global prices in May 2010, with the June 2010 resting $217.11 per ton in the USA as China's paper market began to reopen!

Mexico, America, the EU, Russia and Japan all recycle paper en masse and there are many state run and private schemes running in those countries. 
The recycling rate in Europe reached 64.5%3 in 2007, which confirms that the industry is on the path to meeting its voluntary target of 66% by 2010.

Plastic

Rubber Tires

Ship breaking

Textiles

In many countries, there is an active market in re-selling used clothes. In Britain, this dominated by charity shops who sell donated clean clothes. Less saleable clothes are put into the re-cycling waste stream.  
Textiles are made of a variety of materials including cotton, wool, synthetic plastics, linen, modal and a variety of other materials. The textile's composition will affect its durability and method of recycling.

Textiles entering the re-cycling stream are sorted and separated by workers into good quality clothing and shoes which can be reused or worn. There is a trend of moving these facilities from developed countries to developing countries either for charity or sold at a cheaper price. Many international organisations collect used textiles from developed countries as a donation to those third world countries. This recycling practise is encouraged because it helps to reduce unwanted waste while providing clothing to those in need.
Damaged textiles are further sorted into grades to make industrial wiping cloths and for use in high quality paper manufacture or material suitable for fibre reclamation and filling products. If textile reprocessors receive wet or soiled clothes, however, these may still be disposed of in a landfill, as the washing and drying facilities may not be present at sorting units.

Fibre reclamation mills sort textiles according to fibre type and colour. Colour sorting eliminates the need to re-dye the recycled textiles. The textiles are shredded into "shoddy" fibres and blended with other selected fibres, depending on the intended end use of the recycled yarn. The blended mixture is carded to clean and mix the fibres and spun ready for weaving or knitting. The fibres can also be compressed for mattress production. Textiles sent to the flocking industry are shredded to make filling material for car insulation, roofing felts, loudspeaker cones, panel linings and furniture padding.

According to Earth911.com, "Metal hangers, while made of steel, can be difficult to recycle because their hooks can damage recycling equipment and some have a petroleum coating. Some curbside recycling programs do accept them.... Many dry cleaners take back hangers, too...."

Chat and furnace slag
In North America, mine chat waste can be used on snow-covered roads to improve traction; as gravel; and as construction aggregate, principally for railway ballast, highway construction, and concrete production. Furnace slag and to a lesser degree coal slag have been used in lieu of construction and railway ballast gravel in the UK. Clinker, slag, fly ash and in some cases ashes have all historically been used in places such as the industrial parts of  Yorkshire and South Wales to make domestic cinder paths.

See also
Recycling by material
Index of recycling topics
Henrik Lund-Nielsen
Gypsum recycling
China Metal Recycling

References

External links
Recycling Database - World.Org